Sam Groth and John-Patrick Smith were the defending champion, but they did not play together. Sam Groth played alongside Chris Guccione and lost in the quarterfinals to Ehward Corrie and Daniel Smethurst. John-Patrick Smith decided not to compete this tournament.

Edward Corrie and Daniel Smethurst won the title, defeating Germain Gigounon and Olivier Rochus in the final, 6–2, 6–1.

Seeds

Draw

Draw

References
 Main Draw

Challenger Banque Nationale de Rimouski
Challenger de Drummondville